Oxana Mykolayivna Tsyhuleva (born 15 December 1973) is a Ukrainian trampolinist who won a silver medal at the 2000 Summer Olympics.

Career 
Tsyhuleva competed at her first World Championships in 1996 in Vancouver. She won the gold medal in the synchro competition with Olena Movchan and Ukraine won the team silver medal behind Russia. At the 1998 World Championships in Sydney, she won the silver medal in the individual event behind Russia's Irina Karavayeva. Ukraine won the team bronze medal behind Russia and Belarus. She also won the silver medal in the synchro competition with Olena Movchan behind German trampolinists Tina Ludwig and Anna Dogonadze.

At the 1999 World Championships in Sun City, South Africa, Tsyhuleva once again won the silver medal in the individual event behind Irina Karavayeva. The Ukrainian team of Tsyhuleva, Olena Movchan, and Oxana Verbitskaya won the silver medal behind Russia. She reclaimed her synchro World title with Movchan.

Tsyhuleva was selected to represent Ukraine at the 2000 Summer Olympics for the inaugural Olympic trampoline competition. She qualified for the women's individual trampoline event in third place. In the final, she won the silver medal behind Irina Karavayeva.

Tsyhuleva competed at the 2001 World Championships in Odense, Denmark. She finished eighth in the individual competition. She won the team gold medal alongside Yulia Domshevsky, Olena Movchan, and Oxana Pochynok, and she once again won the synchro gold medal with Olena Movchan. She then competed at the 2001 World Games in Akita, Japan. She won the gold medal with Olena Movchan in the synchronized trampoline event.

References 

1973 births
Living people
Ukrainian female trampolinists
Sportspeople from Mykolaiv
Gymnasts at the 2000 Summer Olympics
Olympic silver medalists for Ukraine
Olympic medalists in gymnastics
Medalists at the 2000 Summer Olympics
Competitors at the 2001 World Games
World Games gold medalists
20th-century Ukrainian women
21st-century Ukrainian women